Saint Cassius of Clermont is venerated as a Christian martyr of the 3rd century. He was a senator who was converted to Christianity by Austromoine.

Cassius was killed with Victorinus (a pagan priest who had also been converted by Austremonius), Maximus, Anatolius, Linguinus, and others at Clermont-Ferrand by Chrocas, the chieftain of the Alemanni, who were invading Roman Gaul at the time. Chrocas is said to have killed a total of 6,266 Christians at Clermont at this time, according to tradition.

Gregory of Tours mentions a Church of Saint Cassius the Martyr at Clermont.

References

External links
 Cassius e.v.a. van Clermont

Senators of the Roman Empire
3rd-century Christian martyrs
260s deaths
Gallo-Roman saints
Converts to Christianity from pagan religions
Clergy from Clermont-Ferrand
Year of birth unknown